Maria Ibeshi Hewa (born 10 June 1950) is a Member of Parliament in the National Assembly of Tanzania.

Sources
 Parliament of Tanzania profile

Living people
Members of the National Assembly (Tanzania)
1950 births
Place of birth missing (living people)
21st-century Tanzanian women politicians